Love + War is the second studio album by the American glam metal band Lillian Axe, released in 1989. The album was reissued and remastered by Metal Mind Productions in 2007. "My Number" was originally written and recorded by the NWOBHM era band Girl for their first album, Sheer Greed (1980). The album cover features Sharon Case, who made appearances on General Hospital.

Critical reception

In 2005, Love + War was ranked number 296 in Rock Hard magazine's book of The 500 Greatest Rock & Metal Albums of All Time.

Track listing

Personnel
Ron Taylor – lead vocals
Steve Blaze – lead guitar, backing vocals, keyboards
Jon Ster – rhythm guitar, backing vocals, keyboards
Rob Stratton – bass guitar
Danny King – drums

References

1989 albums
Lillian Axe albums
Albums produced by Tony Platt
MCA Records albums